Shahriar Negahdaripour from the University of Miami, Coral Gables, Florida was named Fellow of the Institute of Electrical and Electronics Engineers (IEEE) in 2012 for contributions to underwater computer vision.

References

Fellow Members of the IEEE
Living people
University of Miami faculty
Year of birth missing (living people)
Place of birth missing (living people)
American electrical engineers